Union Township is one of fourteen townships in Shelby County, Indiana. As of the 2010 census, its population was 970 and it contained 395 housing units.

Union Township was organized in 1822, and reorganized with its present borders in 1840.

Geography

Unincorporated towns
 Rays Crossing

References

External links
 Indiana Township Association
 United Township Association of Indiana

Townships in Shelby County, Indiana
Townships in Indiana